James Dean Scranton (born April 5, 1960 in Torrance, California) is a former Major League Baseball infielder. Scranton played in eight games in the majors, 6 as a shortstop, 1 as a third baseman, and one as a pinch-runner. Scranton never had a hit, going 0-for-6, but did score as a pinch runner.

Scranton played in the minor leagues from 1980 until 1986, all in the Royals organization. He was originally drafted by the Oakland Athletics in 1978, but never signed with them, instead signing as a free agent with the Royals in 1980.

References 

Major League Baseball shortstops
Kansas City Royals players
1960 births
Living people
Baseball players from California
Palomar Comets baseball players
Arizona Wildcats baseball players
Charleston Royals players
Fort Myers Royals players
Jacksonville Suns players
Omaha Royals players
American expatriate baseball players in Italy
Fortitudo Baseball Bologna players